Disclosed (simplified Chinese: 揭秘), is a Singaporean television drama series produced by Wawa Pictures. It stars Tender Huang, Jesseca Liu, Andie Chen, Shane Pow and Tang Lingyi as the main characters in the story. It is also the third Wawa-production to air on MediaCorp Channel 8. The story revolves around an elite team of lawyers specializing in cybercrimes such as Internet fraud, celebrity privacy and online money laundering.

It had aired on MediaCorp Channel 8 in Singapore from 28 October 2013 to 22 November 2013. During this period, a total of 20 episodes have aired.

Episodic Synopsis

References

See also
Wawa Pictures
Disclosed
List of programmes broadcast by Mediacorp Channel 8

Lists of Singaporean television series episodes
Lists of soap opera episodes
2013 Singaporean television series debuts
2013 Singaporean television series endings